Martin May may refer to:

 Martin O. May, Medal of Honor recipient
 Martin May (actor) (born 1961), German actor
 Martin May, founder of the Brightkite networking site
 Leigh Martin May (born 1971), United States federal judge